Universidad Indígena de Venezuela (Indigenous University of Venezuela, UIV) is a public university created in 2010 based in Tauca, Bolívar State. Aimed at Venezuela's indigenous communities, it has campuses in Bolívar and Amazonas, and a 2010 enrolment of 810. The indigenous people of Venezuela make up only around 1.5% of the population nationwide, but the proportion is nearly 50% in Amazonas.

References

Indigena de Venezuela, Universidad
Educational institutions established in 2010
2010 establishments in Venezuela
Buildings and structures in Bolívar (state)